Steal Hear is the seventh studio album by American hip hop recording artist Coolio. It was released on October 28, 2008 via Super Cool Recordings. The only single is Gangsta Walk, which features Snoop Dogg, and was released in 2006, on Coolio's fifth album. Most songs on this album were taken from Coolio's previous studio album The Return of the Gangsta, which was released in 2006.

Track listing
Track list confirmed by iTunes and songwriting credits are confirmed by AllMusic.

Personnel
Credits are adapted from AllMusic and Discogs.

 Artis "Coolio" Ivey, Jr. – main artist, executive producer
 Calvin "Snoop Dogg" Broadus – featured artist (track 1)
 Black Orchid – featured artist (track 3)
 Artis "A.I." Ivey III – featured artist (tracks: 5, 12)
 Gangsta-Lu – featured artist (tracks: 8, 11), additional vocals (track 1)
 Blair "Goast" Bryson – featured artist (tracks: 6, 9)
 Miss K-La – featured artist (track 7)
 Emo – featured artist (track 9)
 Vizhun – featured artist (track 9)
 Larry "LV" Sanders – featured artist (track 13)
 Sergio Fertitta – keyboards, drum programming, arranger, engineer, producer (tracks: 1, 6-8, 11)
 Chris Muzik – guitar (tracks: 1, 6-8, 11), electric bass (tracks: 6-8, 11)
 Massimiliano "Big Fish" Dagani – producer (tracks: 2, 5, 12)
 A. Pallaz – producer (tracks: 2, 5, 12)
 Polar Bear – producer (track 3)
 Victor Concepcion – producer (tracks: 4, 9)
 Peter Catera – producer (track 10)
 Toni Cottura – producer (track 10)
 Kenneth Blue – producer (track 13)
 R. "Rob Lowe" Mixon – producer (tracks: 14, 15)
 Black Thompson – producer (track 14)
 David "Mozart" Korkis – producer (track 15)
 Jarel "Jarez" Posey – vocals engineering (track 1), recording, mixing, engineering, art direction
 Dave Pensado – mixing (track 13)

References

2008 albums
Coolio albums